The 2021 season for  was the eleventh season in the team's existence, all of which have been as a UCI WorldTeam. This was the third season with Ineos as the title sponsor and the first full season with the current name.

Team roster 

 

Riders who joined the team for the 2021 season

Riders who left the team during or after the 2020 season

Season victories

National, Continental, and World Champions

Notes

References

External links 
 

Ineos Grenadiers
2021
Ineos Grenadiers